Dasyophthalma rusina is a butterfly of the family Nymphalidae. It is found in Brazil, from Bahia to Santa Catarina. The habitat consists of high altitude areas (about 1,200 meters).

The larvae feed on Geonoma schottiana, Bactris tomentosa, Euterpe edulis and Bambusa species.

Subspecies
Dasyophthalma rusina rusina (Brazil)
Dasyophthalma rusina delanira Hewitson, 1862 (Brazil)
Dasyophthalma rusina principesa Stichel, 1904 (Brazil: Espírito Santo)

References

Butterflies described in 1824
Morphinae
Fauna of Brazil
Nymphalidae of South America